Chihchun Chi-sun Lee (born 1970) is a composer of contemporary classical music.  Dr. Lee is originally from Kaohsiung, Taiwan, and is currently an invited professor of composition at Ewha Womans University, in Seoul, Korea, She received a doctoral degree from the University of Michigan, two master's degrees from Ohio University, and a bachelor’s degree from Soochow University in Taiwan. Her teachers included William Albright, William Bolcom, Bright Sheng, and Loong-Hsing Wen. She has previously taught music at Johnson County Community College, Washburn University, Rhodes College, and the University of Michigan, and is currently on the faculty of the University of South Florida.

She has received numerous honors; these include winning the 1st Brandenburg Biennial Composers Competition
, the Guggenheim Fellowship, the Harvard Fromm Music Fellowship, Taiwan National Culture and Arts Foundation commissions, Theodore Front Prize from International Alliance for Women in Music, ISCM/League of Composers Competition, International Festival of Women Composers Composition Prize, Florida Artist Enhancement Grant, Arts Council of Hillsborough County Individual Artist Grant, the SCI/ASCAP Student Composer Commission, the Hong Kong Chou Scholarship, the Joyce Dutka Arts Foundation, the "Music Taipei" award, the Fresh Ink Orchestral Composition Competition, the Margaret Blackburn Competition, NACUSA, the Taiwan Environmental Protection Bureau Music Contest, the Taiwan Provincial Music Competition, the Taiwan National Songwriting Prize, a Taiwan International Community Radio grant, and the Taiwan International Young Composers Competition.  Some of her most significant premiers have included her Concerto for Zheng in Carnegie Hall, and a concert dedicated to her music in Taiwan National Concert Hall.  In addition, her music has had numerous performances and broadcasts worldwide in Australia, Austria, Bulgaria, Canada, Croatia, the Czech Republic, France, Germany, Hawaii, the Netherlands, the Philippines, Poland, Singapore, Taiwan, Costa Rica, Ukraine, and around the continental United States. She has previously taught at Johnson County Community College, Washburn University, Rhodes College, and the University of Michigan.  Her works appear on CDs from the Albany/Capstone label, ERMedia’s Masterworks, NACUSA and Celebrity Music Pte. Ltd. in Singapore.   She has worked with indigenous instrument groups, such as Chai Found Music Workshop, Music From China, the Taiwan National Chinese Orchestra, the Taipei Chinese traditional orchestra and other Chinese instrumentalists, including zheng virtuoso, Haiqiong Deng.

Lee’s work has been reviewed in Gramophone (08/07) and Preußenspiegel, Brandenburger Wochenblatt (BRAWO), Märkische Allgemeine, and Märkische Allgemeine Brandenburger Stadtkurier from Germany (09/06)

Other notes regarding name: this individual uses the unusual name "Chihchun Chi-sun Lee" as a reflection of her Taiwanese identity.  It is actually a realization of her Chinese characters (李志純) in two languages—Mandarin "Chihchun" and Hok-lo Taiwanese "Chi-sun" (Lee being the same in either language.)  She has also been known by other spellings, such as "Chih Chun," "ChihChun," and "Chih-Chun" (also with the name sometimes misspelled as "Chichun").  In Korean, her name is sometimes spelled as 이지순 (I JiSun), 이지선 (I JiSeon), and 리치천 (Ri ChiCheon.)

References

Fleming, John (November 29, 2007). "Taiwanese composer's score debuts at USF". Tampa Bay Times.
Personal Website

External links
 Robert Helps International Music Festival 2009

1970 births
21st-century American composers
21st-century classical composers
American women classical composers
American classical composers
American musicians of Taiwanese descent
American women musicians of Chinese descent
Harvard Fellows
Living people
Musicians from Kaohsiung
Taiwanese classical composers
Taiwanese emigrants to the United States
University of Michigan alumni
University of Michigan faculty
University of South Florida faculty
Washburn University faculty
Writers from Tampa, Florida
Johnson County Community College people
21st-century American women musicians
21st-century women composers
American women academics